Nicole Cherry (born Nicoleta Janina Ghinea on 5 December 1998) is a Romanian pop singer.

Career
Cherry performed in a number of singing and dancing competitions as a child. She gained success in 2013 with her single "Memories" which was released at the age of 14.

Cherry won the 2014 Zu Music Award for "Best Breakthrough" artist.

She was chosen to dub the character Sophie in Romanian for Disney movie "The BFG" and to sing the main theme from "Miraculous: Tales of Ladybug & Cat Noir."

Discography

Singles

Year-end charts

Other songs
2013: "Never Say Never"
2013: "Yes I Can"
2014: "The World Is Ours" (with David Correy featuring Monoblanco)
2015: "Până vine vineri"
2015: "Vive la vida" (featuring Mohombi)
2016: "Cine iubește"
2016: "Se poartă vara" (featuring Connect-R)
2017: "Uneori"
2017: "Soy como soy" (featuring Joey Montana)

Featured in
2014: "Ne facem auziți" (Vunk si Ai Nostri)
2015: "Rezervat" (Doddy feat. Nicole Cherry)
2015: "Pot eu să te urăsc" (Angelo feat. Nicole Cherry)
2018: "Grenada" (JUNO feat. Nicole Cherry)
2018: "S'agapao" (Alama feat. Nicole Cherry x Pacha Man)
2018: "Esentele" (Stefania feat. Nicole Cherry)
2018: "Vinovat" (Dorian Popa feat. Nicole Cherry)

Personal life
She is of Romani origin on her maternal side. She has a daughter named Anastasia (born on 27 November 2021) with Florin Popa to whom she is engaged.

References

Living people
1998 births
Musicians from Bucharest
Romanian women pop singers
Romanian child singers
21st-century Romanian singers
21st-century Romanian women singers
Romanian Romani people